Miączyn is a village in Zamość County, Lublin Voivodeship, in eastern Poland. It is the seat of the gmina (administrative district) called Gmina Miączyn.

The village has a population of 749.

References

Villages in Zamość County